Caculo Cabaça Hydroelectric Power Station is a 2.172 GW hydroelectric power station under construction in Angola. When completed, it will be bigger than the 2.070 GW Laúca Hydroelectric Power Station, the largest power station in the country, as of July 2017.

Location
The power station is located at the village of São Pedro da Quilemba, near the city of Dondo, in Cuanza Norte Province. The geographical coordinates of Caculo Cabaça Hydroelectric Power Station are: 09°46'50.0"S, 14°32'58.0"E (Latitude:-9.780556; Longitude:14.549444).

Overview
In August 2017, construction began on this power station, by the selected contractor, China Gezhouba Group Company Limited, with partial funding from the state-owned Industrial and Commercial Bank of China (ICBC). The planned generation capacity at Caculo Cabaça is 2,172 megawatts, to be used in Angola and for export to the countries in the Southern African Power Pool.

Construction is expected to last at least 80 months. In October 2019, the Angola Press News Agency reported that commercial commissioning of this power station was expected in 2024.

Construction costs
The total project cost is budgeted at US $4.5 billion, 85 percent of which was borrowed from ICBC. The construction company, Gezhouba Group, will own, operate and maintain the power station for at least four years after commercial commissioning. During those four years, China Gezhouba will train Angolan technicians on how to manage the power station. An estimated 10,000 workers are expected to be hired during the construction phase.

See also

List of power stations in Angola

References

External links
  Angola Hydropower Country Profile

Power stations in Angola
Hydroelectric power stations in Angola